Jook may refer to:
 Congee, East Asian rice porridge, pronounced  in Cantonese and romanized jook  in some Cantonese diasporic communities.
 Juke joint, informal social establishment
 Jook aka The Jook, a 1970s "junkshop glam" band including Chris Townson formerly of John's Children.